The 2019–20 Syracuse Orange men's basketball team represented Syracuse University during the 2019–20 NCAA Division I men's basketball season. The Orange were led by 44th-year head coach Jim Boeheim and played their home games at the Carrier Dome in Syracuse, New York as seventh-year members of the Atlantic Coast Conference.

The Orange finished the season 18–14, and 10–10 in ACC play.  The team was scheduled to play Louisville in the quarterfinals of the ACC tournament before the tournament was cancelled due to the COVID-19 pandemic.  The NCAA tournament and NIT were also cancelled due to the pandemic.

Previous season
The Orange finished the 2018–19 season 20–14, 10–8 in ACC play to finish in a tie for sixth place. They defeated Pittsburgh in the second round of the 2019 ACC tournament before losing in the quarterfinals to eventual champions Duke. They received an at-large bid to the NCAA tournament where, as a No. 8 seed, they lost to Baylor in the first round.

Offseason

Departures

2019 recruiting class

Roster

Schedule and results

Source:

|-
!colspan=9 style=| Exhibition

|-
!colspan=9 style=| Regular season

|-
!colspan=12 style=| ACC tournament

Rankings

*AP does not release post-NCAA Tournament rankings^Coaches did not release a Week 2 poll.

References

Syracuse Orange men's basketball seasons
Syracuse
Syracuse basketball, men
Syracuse basketball, men